Estakhr-e Pahn is a village in Cheshmeh Sar Rural District, in the Central District of Khansar County, Isfahan Province, Iran. At the 2006 census, its population was 12, in 4 families.

References 

Populated places in Khansar County